Gillian Guzman QC is a Gibraltarian lawyer who is the first woman to be appointed a QC in the territory. She specialises in civil and criminal litigation and mainly deals with human rights, personal injury, family and employment issues.

Guzman studied law at the University of Wales in Cardiff. She was called to the Gibraltar Bar in 1994. In 2004, when the Gibraltar Judiciary hosted the first Human Rights Symposium ever in Gibraltar, Guzman was asked to chair it. She was a panelist on Human Rights of the Child, along with the likes of Dame Elizabeth Butler Sloss, Lady Justice Angawa and Nicholas Critelli. She has also served as junior counsel to the Leading London Counsel with Edward Fitzgerald QC on the largest fraud trial ever to involve Gibraltar. In 2006 she became chair of the Industrial Tribunal. Working for Hassans, the largest law firm in Gibraltar, she has represented a range of clients including the Gibraltar Health Authority on legislation and employment concerns. In March 2012 she was invited to the Queen's Counsel.
Guzman is the first woman to be appointed QC in Gibraltar and the youngest woman to ever be appointed QC at the age of 29 according to Gibraltar International.

References

20th-century Gibraltarian lawyers
Living people
Alumni of the University of Wales
Women lawyers
Year of birth missing (living people)
21st-century Gibraltarian lawyers